The Patriot was a weekly newspaper published in the small town of Prescott, Wisconsin. The first issue, volume one number one of the Patriot was published on Wednesday, September 20, 1871. After a couple of months, the Patriot ended around October 1872. The paper was published by Lemen & Burk. The patriot was valuable to the community both to enhance the town and bring more people to it.

Structure 
The format of the paper created an easy read for the readers. The paper consisted of 4 pages and on each page, were 7 columns. On the far-right hand corner, the paper included pricing for advertising sections within the newspaper itself. The first page illustrates the newspaper title in the middle bolded in black, as well as the publishers and date on the far-left corner. The paper also features article titles for each new starting article.

Content 
The Patriot covered a variety of things ranging from: national-local news, local business cards, advertisements, recipes, and stories. The first page of the paper consisted of both national and local news. The Patriot showed great attention in democracy and by doing so it provided the people with information on government and politics. For example, on the first page in column three, the article “Democratic Platform” gives an insight to the readers on the representatives of democratic party of Wisconsin. Based on the political views conveyed throughout page one, Lemen and Burk ensured that the paper held to the principles of the Democratic party. Page one also consisted of local business advertisements such as: William Lesemann: Boots and Shoes, John Pearson Barber Shop, and Muller & WestFall: Banking and Exchange Office, etc. Although the second page is difficult to read, it contains journalistic news topic different countries. Throughout the newspaper, second page is the only page without any display of advertisements. Along with the political coverage, the Patriot also reflected on the values and interests of the community. As depicted in all four columns of page three there’s a variety of topics illustrated that might have been an interest for the residents of Prescott, Wisconsin at the time. On the first column of page three there were several different fruit recipes one could choose from for example, how to make peach marmalade or pickled peaches. The paper also gave descriptions of different markets in other states like the; New York Produce Market, Chicago Market, ST. Louis Market. It showed the type of produce and prices offered throughout different markets. The Patriot also included short stories, which served as a source of entertainment to the readers. A story one can find is located on the third page bottom half of column three titled “Josh Billings on Free Love”, which is about a man who craves love and freedom. The forth page is where most of the advertisement are displayed. The local newspaper advertising helped business owners grow as well as networking and getting known in the community.

Notes

References 
 Atwood, D., Culver, J. O., & Page, H. M. (1872, October 22). Pierce County and Her Towns. Wisconsin State Journal, 21(44), p. 2.
 Lemen, ., & Burk, . (1871, September 20). Democratic Platform. The Prescott Patriot, 1(1), pp. 1.

Defunct newspapers published in Wisconsin
Pierce County, Wisconsin